Galina Rezchikova (21 December 1934 – 1994) was a Soviet sprinter. She competed in the women's 100 metres at the 1956 Summer Olympics.

References

External links
 

1934 births
1994 deaths
Athletes (track and field) at the 1956 Summer Olympics
Soviet female sprinters
Olympic athletes of the Soviet Union
Place of birth missing
Olympic female sprinters